October Road is the fifteenth studio album by singer-songwriter James Taylor released in 2002. The album would be Taylor's last album of original material until Before This World in 2015. It was nominated for the Grammy 
Award for Best Male Pop Performance at the 45th Grammy Awards in 2003. The album debuted at number four on the Billboard 200 with 154,000 copies sold in its opening week, which is Taylor's best performing album in the SoundScan era. The album was certified Platinum by the RIAA on November 21, 2002, and had sold 1,076,000 copies in the US as of May 2015.

The album has two versions: a single-disc version and a "limited edition" two-disc version, which contains three extra songs, as well as a video presentation.

Track listing
All songs written by James Taylor except where noted.
"September Grass" (John I. Sheldon) – 4:51
"October Road" – 3:57
"On the 4th of July" – 3:25
"Whenever You're Ready" – 4:14
"Belfast to Boston" – 4:16
"Mean Old Man" – 3:44
"My Traveling Star" – 3:55
"Raised Up Family" – 4:40
"Carry Me on My Way" – 4:30
"Caroline I See You" – 4:58
"Baby Buffalo" – 4:50
"Have Yourself a Merry Little Christmas" (Hugh Martin, Ralph Blane) – 3:50

Included on the second disc of the "limited edition" two-disc version:
"Don't Let Me Be Lonely Tonight" – 4:43 won the Best Male Pop Vocal Performance at the 44th Grammy Awards in 2002.
"Benjamin" (J. Taylor, composed in 1976 or 1977 as a tribute/lullaby to his new-coming or -born son. First released by David Sanborn on Promise Me the Moon in December 1977) – 3:30
"Sailing to Philadelphia" (Mark Knopfler) – 5:28

Charts

Weekly charts

Year-end charts

Personnel 

 James Taylor – lead vocals, guitars, backing vocals (1, 3, 7, 11), harmony vocals (2)
 Rob Mounsey – keyboards (1, 7), synthesizers (3, 6), synth bagpipes (5), penny whistle (5), percussion (5), string pad (10, 12), string arrangements (12)
 M. Hans Liebert – synth conga (1, 4), acoustic piano (5), synth percussion (8)
 Clifford Carter – organ (2), keyboards (3), acoustic piano intro (10), Rhodes (10), synth organ (11), synth pad (12)
 Greg Phillinganes – keyboards (4, 5, 8)
 Larry Goldings – acoustic piano (6, 12)
 Robbie Kilgore – acoustic piano (10)
 John Sheldon – guitar harmonics (1)
 Ry Cooder – lead guitar (2)
 Michael Landau – rhythm guitar (2), electric guitar (3, 4), gut-string guitar (3), guitars (8, 9), guitar solo (9)
 John Pizzarelli – guitars (6, 12)
 Mark Knopfler – guitar, backing vocals (track 3, CD 2)
 Jimmy Johnson – bass guitar
 Steve Gadd – drums
 Luis Conte – percussion (2-4, 7-9, 11)
 Michael Brecker – saxophones (2), (track 1, CD 2)
 Lou Marini – saxophone (4, 8)
 Harry Allen – tenor saxophone (12)
 Walt Fowler – trumpet (4, 8)
 Richard Sebring – French horn (5)
 Tommy Morgan – harmonica (10)
 Dave Grusin – string arrangements and conductor (6, 7, 10)
 Ralph Morrison III – concertmaster (6, 7, 10)
 Stephen Erdody – cello (6, 7, 10)
 Paula Hochhalter – cello (6, 7, 10)
 Yo-Yo Ma – cello (track 2, CD 2)
 Edgar Meyer – double bass (track 2, CD 2)
 Karen Bakunin – viola (6, 7, 10)
 Brian Dembow – viola (6, 7, 10)
 Carrie Holzman-Little – viola (6, 7, 10)
 Stuart Duncan – violin solo (2, 7)
 Bruce Dukov – violin (6, 7, 10)
 Julie Ann Gigante – violin (6, 7, 10)
 Alan Grunfeld – violin (6, 7, 10)
 Tamara Hatwan – violin (6, 7, 10)
 Karen Jones – violin (6, 7, 10)
 Natalie Leggett – violin (6, 7, 10)
 Liane Mautner – violin (6, 7, 10)
 Robin Olson – violin (6, 7, 10)
 Margaret Wooten – violin (6, 7, 10)
 Kenneth Yerke – violin (6, 7, 10)
 Cenovia Cummins – violin (12)
 Richard Sortomme – violin (12)
 Donna Tecco – violin (12)
 Belinda Whitney – violin (12)
 Mark O'Connor – violin (track 2, CD 2)
 David Lasley – backing vocals (1, 3, 4, 8), harmony vocals (2), chorus (5)
 Kate Markowitz – backing vocals (1, 3, 4, 8), chorus (5)
 Arnold McCuller – backing vocals (1, 3, 4, 8), harmony vocals (2), chorus (5)
 Caroline Taylor – backing vocals (1)
 Chiara Civello – backing vocals (3)
 Michael Eisenstein – chorus (5)
 Nina Gordon – chorus (5)
 Josh Lattanzi – chorus (5)
 Steve Scully – chorus (5)
 Sally Taylor – backing vocals (7, 11)
 Andrea Zonn – violin (12), backing vocals (1, 3, 4, 8), chorus (5)

Production 
 Producer – Russ Titelman
 Production Coordinator – JoAnn Tominaga
 Engineer – Dave O’Donnell
 Additional Engineers – Mark Howard and M. Hans Liebert
 Assistant Engineers – Matt Beaudoin, Jimmy Hoyson, M. Hans Liebert, Bruce MacFarlane, Ben Parrish, Joe Prins, Keith Shortreed, Rafi Sofer, Joe Wormer and Luke Yaeger.
 Recorded at Linden Oaks Studios (Rochester, NY); Right Track Recording, Clinton Recording Studio, Secret Studio and Flying Monkey Studio (New York, NY); Signal Path Studios (Nashville, TN); Q Division Studios (Somerville, MA); The Village Recorder (Los Angeles, CA); Capitol Studios (Hollywood, CA).
 Mixed by Dave O’Donnell and Russ Titelman at Right Track Recording.
 Mix Assistant – Ryan Smith 
 Mastered by Ted Jensen at Sterling Sound (New York, NY).
 Cover Consultant – Stephanie Mauer
 Art Direction – Gail Marowitz
 Design – Giulio Turturro
 Photography – Sante D’Orazio, Craig Nelson and Russ Titelman.
 Personal Assistant – Jessica Byrne Kusmin 
 Management – Gary Borman and Barbara Rose for Borman Entertainment.

References

2002 albums
James Taylor albums
Albums produced by Russ Titelman
Columbia Records albums